James Sutherland Spore (May 13, 1885 – April 28, 1937) was a commander in the United States Navy.  He served as acting governor of Guam from February 27, 1921 to February 7, 1922 and as acting governor of American Samoa from March 24, 1931 to April 22, 1931.

James S. Spore grew up in Bay City, Michigan and graduated from the U.S. Naval Academy with the nickname of "Wooden Willie."  His sister was Marian Spore Bush and he had three children.

Career 
Spore served as acting Naval governor of Guam from February 27, 1921 to February 7, 1922.

Spore served as acting governor of American Samoa from March 24, 1931 to April 22, 1931.

As of 1933, he was stationed in San Pedro, California.  After retiring from the Navy, he moved to La Mesa, California (in San Diego County) to farm avocados.

Personal life 
On April 29, 1916, Spore married Grace Walling at St. Andrews Episcopal Church in South Orange, New Jersey.

In 1937, Spore died in La Mesa, California.

References

External links 
 James Sutherland Spore at findagrave.com
 James Sutherland Spore at ourcampaigns.com
 Burns W. Spore oral history interview, April 28, 2001 at ecu.edu

1885 births
1937 deaths
People from Bay City, Michigan
United States Naval Academy alumni
United States Navy officers
Governors of Guam
Governors of American Samoa
Military personnel from Michigan